During the 1984–85 English football season, Gillingham F.C. competed in the Football League Third Division, the third tier of the English football league system.  It was the 53rd season in which Gillingham competed in the Football League, and the 35th since the club was voted back into the league in 1950.  Gillingham finished the season in fourth place in the Third Division league table, missing out on promotion to the Second Division by one place.

Gillingham also competed in three knock-out competitions, reaching the fourth round of the FA Cup and the second round of the Football League Cup but losing in the first round of the Associate Members' Cup.  The team played 56 competitive matches, winning 30, drawing 9, and losing 17.  Tony Cascarino was the club's leading goalscorer, scoring 20 goals in all competitions.  Keith Oakes made the most appearances, playing 54 times.

Background and pre-season

The 1984–85 season was Gillingham's 53rd season playing in the Football League and the 35th since the club was elected back into the League in 1950 after being voted out in 1938. It was the club's 11th consecutive season in the Football League Third Division, the third tier of the English football league system, since the team gained promotion from the Fourth Division in 1974.  In the 10 seasons since then, the team had achieved a best finish of fourth place, one position away from promotion to the Second Division, in the 1978–79 season. The club had never reached the second level of English football in its history.

Keith Peacock was the club's manager for a fourth season, having been appointed in July 1981.  Paul Taylor served as assistant manager and Bill Collins, who had been with the club in a variety of roles since the early 1960s, held the posts of first-team trainer and manager of the youth team.

In his place, Gillingham signed two experienced defenders, Keith Oakes from Newport County and Joe Hinnigan from Preston North End. The club also signed two players who were out of contract, Tarki Micallef, a midfielder who had last played for Newport, and Dave Shearer, a forward who had most recently played for Grimsby Town, as well as forward Paul Shinners from semi-professional club Fisher Athletic. The team prepared for the new season with friendlies against Brighton & Hove Albion of the Football League Second Division and near-neighbours Maidstone United, the previous season's champions of the Alliance Premier League, the highest level of non-League football. The club also held an open day, during which supporters could obtain players' autographs and watch a specially-arranged training session.

Third Division

August–December
Gillingham's first game of the season was at home to Newport on 25 August; Oakes made his debut against his former club and Hinnigan also played his first game for Gillingham.  The match ended in a 1–1 draw, Tony Cascarino scoring Gillingham's first goal of the season.

January–May
Gillingham finished the season in fourth place and thus missed out on promotion by one place.

League match results
Key

In result column, Gillingham's score shown first
H = Home match
A = Away match

pen. = Penalty kick
o.g. = Own goal

Partial league table

FA Cup
Gillingham lost in the fourth round of the 1984–85 FA Cup to Ipswich Town.

FA Cup match results
Key

In result column, Gillingham's score shown first
H = Home match
A = Away match

pen. = Penalty kick
o.g. = Own goal

Football League Cup
Gillingham lost in the second round of the 1984–85 Football League Cup to Leeds United.

Football League Cup match results
Key

In result column, Gillingham's score shown first
H = Home match
A = Away match

pen. = Penalty kick
o.g. = Own goal

Associate Members' Cup
Gillingham lost in the first round of the 1984–85 Associate Members' Cup to Colchester United.

Associate Members' Cup match results
Key

In result column, Gillingham's score shown first
H = Home match
A = Away match

pen. = Penalty kick
o.g. = Own goal

Player details

Aftermath
Cascarino was voted into the Professional Footballers' Association Team of the Year for the Third Division by his fellow professionals, the fourth consecutive season in which a Gillingham player had been selected.

Gillingham remained contenders for promotion in the 1985–86 season, again challenging for the top three, but ultimately finished fifth after a poor run in the last six games of the season.

References

Works cited

 

Gillingham F.C. seasons
Gillingham